Rhiwfron railway station is a railway station serving Rhiwfron in Ceredigion in Mid-Wales. It is an intermediate station on the preserved Vale of Rheidol Railway.

A station or halt has existed here since the opening of the line, but with few facilities beyond the provision of a nameboard. During 2013 the station was considerably enhanced following a grant for rural infrastructure development from the European Union. The station now has a raised and surfaced platform, fencing, and an ornate station building constructed in the style of architecture employed by the original owners of the railway.

Heritage railway stations in Ceredigion
Vale of Rheidol Railway stations
Railway stations in Great Britain opened in 1903
Railway stations in Great Britain closed in 1939
Railway stations in Great Britain opened in 1945
Railway stations in Great Britain without road access